"Fistful of Tears" is a R&B song by American recording artist Maxwell. The song is taken from his platinum album BLACKsummers'night, and reached number-eleven on Billboard's R&B/Hip-Hop Songs chart. The music video was directed by Philip Andelman.

Charts

Weekly charts

Year-end charts

References

External links
 www.musze.com

2010 singles
Maxwell (musician) songs
2008 songs
Columbia Records singles
Songs written by Maxwell (musician)
Contemporary R&B ballads
Soul ballads
2000s ballads
Music videos directed by Philip Andelman